Peru LNG is a natural gas liquefaction plant in Pampa Melchorita, Peru, at the  of the South Pan American Highway in San Vicente de Cañete.  It is the first natural gas liquefaction plant in South America.

The plant was officially inaugurated on 10 June 2010, and cost US$3.8 billion. It has a nominal capacity of 4.4 million tons of LNG per year. The plant is supplied from Repsol YPF and Petrobras developed fields near the Camisea fields. The  supply pipeline runs  from Chinquintirca in Ayacucho area to the LNG plant.

The plant was designed and built by Chicago Bridge & Iron Company. The marine terminal was built by the CDB consortium (Saipem, Jan De Nul, and Odebrecht). The pipeline system was installed by Techint.

The LNG plant is operated by Peru LNG which is a consortium of Hunt Oil Company (50%), SK Energy (20%), Shell (20%), and Marubeni (10%).

References

Oil and gas companies of Peru
Liquefied natural gas plants